Robert Bontine Cunninghame Graham (24 May 1852 – 20 March 1936) was a Scottish politician, writer, journalist and adventurer. He was a Liberal Party Member of Parliament (MP); the first ever socialist member of the Parliament of the United Kingdom; a founder, and the first president, of the Scottish Labour Party; a founder of the National Party of Scotland in 1928; and the first president of the Scottish National Party in 1934.

Youth
Cunninghame Graham was the eldest son of Major William Bontine of the Renfrew Militia and formerly a Cornet in the Scots Greys with whom he served in Ireland. His mother was the Hon. Anne Elizabeth Elphinstone-Fleeming, daughter of Admiral Charles Elphinstone-Fleeming of Cumbernauld and a Spanish noblewoman, Doña Catalina Paulina Alessandro de Jiménez, who reputedly, along with her second husband, Admiral James Katon, heavily influenced Cunninghame Graham's upbringing. Thus the first language Cunninghame Graham learned was his mother's maternal tongue, Spanish. He spent most of his childhood on the family estate of Finlaystone in Renfrewshire and Ardoch in Dunbartonshire, Scotland, with his younger brothers Charles and Malise.

After being educated at Harrow public school in England, Robert finished his education in Brussels, Belgium, before moving to Argentina to make his fortune cattle ranching. He became known as a great adventurer and gaucho there, and was affectionately known as Don Roberto. He also travelled in Morocco disguised as a Turkish sheikh to find the "forbidden" city of Taroudant but was captured by a Caid (Si Taieb ben Si Ahmed El Hassan El Kintafi), prospected for gold in Spain, befriended Buffalo Bill in Texas, and taught fencing in Mexico City, having travelled there by wagon train from San Antonio de Bexar with his young bride sic "Gabrielle Marie de la Balmondiere" a supposed half-French, half-Chilean poet.

Convert to socialism
After the death of his father in 1883 he reverted to the Cunninghame Graham surname. He returned to the UK and became interested in politics. He attended socialist meetings where he heard and met William Morris, George Bernard Shaw, H. M. Hyndman, Keir Hardie and John Burns. Despite his wealthy origins, Graham was converted to socialism and he began to speak at public meetings. He was an impressive orator and was especially good at dealing with hecklers.

Liberal Party MP

Although a socialist, in the 1886 general election he stood as a Liberal Party candidate at North West Lanarkshire. His election programme was extremely radical and called for:

the abolition of the House of Lords
universal suffrage
the nationalisation of land, mines and other industries
free school meals
disestablishment of the Church of England
Scottish Home Rule
the establishment of an eight-hour working day

Supported by liberals and socialists, Graham defeated the Unionist candidate by 322 votes. He had stood against the same candidate at the 1885 general election, in which he was defeated by over 1100 votes.

Robert Cunninghame Graham refused to accept the conventions of the British House of Commons. On 12 September 1887 he was suspended from parliament for making what was called a "disrespectful reference" to the House of Lords. He was the first MP ever to be suspended from the House of Commons for swearing; the word was damn.

Graham's main concerns in the House of Commons were the plight of the unemployed and the preservation of civil liberties. He complained about attempts in 1886 and 1887 by the police to prevent public meetings and free speech. He attended the protest demonstration in Trafalgar Square on 13 November 1887 that was broken up by the police and became known as Bloody Sunday. Graham was badly beaten during his arrest and taken to Bow Street Police Station, where his uncle, Col William Hope VC, attempted to post bail. Both Cunninghame Graham, who was defended by H. H. Asquith, and John Burns were found guilty for their involvement in the demonstration and sentenced to six weeks imprisonment.

When Graham was released from Pentonville prison he continued his campaign to improve the rights of working people and to curb their economic exploitation. He was suspended from the House of Commons in December 1888 for protesting about the working conditions of the chain makers of Cradley Heath. His response to the Speaker of the House, "I never withdraw", was later used by George Bernard Shaw in Arms and the Man.

Scottish independence and the Scottish Labour Party
Graham was a strong supporter of Scottish independence. In 1886, he helped establish the Scottish Home Rule Association (SHRA), and while in the House of Commons, he made several attempts to persuade fellow MPs of the desirability of a Scottish parliament. On one occasion, Graham joked that he wanted a "national parliament with the pleasure of knowing that the taxes were wasted in Edinburgh instead of London."

In 1888, Graham attended the SHRA Conference at the Anderton's Hotel in Fleet Street and passed a motion "That in the opinion of this Conference the interests of Scotland demand the establishment of a Scotch national Parliament and an Executive Government having control over exclusively Scotch affairs, with a due regard to the integrity of the Empire". The motion was supported by Mr Cuninghame Graham (as name spelt in article), who said he "wanted a Scotch Parliament to do justice to their crofters and keep them at home, to pass an Eight Hours' Bill for their miners, to settle the liquor laws, and to nationalise the land." Peter Esslemont MP attended. Dr G.B Clark Chaired conference MP for Caithness-shire.
  
While in the House of Commons, Graham became increasingly more radical and went on to found the Scottish Labour Party with Keir Hardie. Graham left the Liberal Party in 1892 to contest the general election in a new constituency as a Labour candidate.

He supported workers in their industrial disputes and was involved with Annie Besant and the Matchgirls Strike and the 1889 Dockers' Strike. In July 1889, he attended the Marxist Congress of the Second International in Paris with James Keir Hardie, William Morris, Eleanor Marx and Edward Aveling. The following year he made a speech in Calais that was considered by the authorities to be so revolutionary that he was arrested and expelled from France.

Graham was a supporter of the eight-hour day and made several attempts to introduce a Bill on the subject. He made some progress with this in the summer of 1892, but he was unable to persuade the Conservative government, headed by Lord Salisbury, to allocate time for the Bill to be fully debated.

At the 1892 general election Graham stood as the Scottish Labour Party candidate for Glasgow Camlachie. He was defeated, bringing his parliamentary career to an end. He remained active in political circles, though, helping his colleague Keir Hardie establish the Independent Labour Party and enter parliament as the MP for West Ham. However, he became disillusioned by the pettiness and dissent of those he called "piss-pot socialists" and increasingly turned to a nascent Scottish nationalism as a means of achieving social justice and cultural revival.

Graham retained a strong belief in Scottish home rule. He played an active part in the establishment of the National Party of Scotland (NPS) in 1928 and was elected the Honorary President of the new Scottish National Party in 1934. He was several times the Glasgow University Scottish Nationalist Association candidate for the Lord Rectorship of the University of Glasgow, which he lost by only sixty-six votes in 1928 to Stanley Baldwin, the Conservative Prime Minister at the time. This event was pivotal in the founding of the National Party, and the eventual creation of the Scottish National Party in the 1930s.

Because of his Scottish nationalism, and criticism of what he saw as the Labour Party's timidity and lack of socialist zeal, Graham has been effectively written out of Labour Party history, and the belief has been circulated that after his electoral defeat in 1892, he retired from politics until the late 1920s. This is entirely incorrect; in fact, between 1905 and 1914, Graham, while retaining the position of elder statesman, social commentator, and renowned world-traveller, became more militant, involving himself in many left-wing causes and protests. There is evidence to suggest that he joined the hard-left British Socialist Party, and he was an associate of anarchists and a political assassin. Graham was also a vociferous anti-imperialist at the height of British jingoism as well as a high-profile supporter of the women's suffrage movement and Home Rule for Ireland and India.

Author
Between 1888 and 1892, Graham was a prolific contributor to small-circulation socialist journals, but his literary career took off when he was recruited by Frank Harris to write for the Saturday Review in 1895, and he continued writing for the Saturday until 1926, as well as other journals. His main form was the 'sketch', or sketch-tale', mostly descriptive, atmospheric works on South America and Scotland, which gave his work a unique aesthetic, which carried a subtext of anti-colonialism, nostalgia, and loss. T. E. Lawrence (of Arabia) described his Scottish sketches as "the rain-in-the-air-and-on-the-roof mournfulness of Scotch music in his time-past style [. . .] snap-shots - the best verbal snapshots ever taken I believe." His many works were collected into anthologies. Subject matter included history, biography, poetry, essays, politics, travel and seventeen collections of short stories or literary sketches. Titles include Father Archangel of Scotland (1896 in conjunction with his wife Gabriela), Thirteen Stories (1900), Success (1902), Hope (1910), Scottish Stories (1914), Brought Forward (1916)  and Mirages (1936). Biographies included: Hernando de Soto (1903), Doughty Deeds (1925), a biography of his great-great-grandfather, Robert Graham of Gartmore and Portrait of a Dictator (1933). His great-niece and biographer, Jean, Lady Polwarth, published a collection of his short stories (or sketches) entitled Beattock for Moffatt and the Best of Cunninghame Graham (1979) and Alexander Maitland added his selection under the title Tales of Horsemen (1981). Professor John Walker published collections of Cunninghame Graham's South American Sketches (1978), Scottish Sketches (1982) and North American Sketches (1986) and Kennedy & Boyd republished the stories and sketches in five volumes (2011 - 2012). In 1988 The Century Travellers reprinted his Mogreb-el-Acksa (1898) and A Vanished Arcadia (1901). The former was the inspiration for George Bernard Shaw's play Captain Brassbound's Conversion. The latter helped inspire the award-winning film The Mission. More recently The Long Riders Guild Press have reprinted his equestrian travel works in their Cunninghame Graham Collection.

He helped his close friend Joseph Conrad, whom he had introduced to his publisher Edward Garnett at Duckworth, with research for Nostromo. Other literary friends included Ford Madox Ford, John Galsworthy, W. H. Hudson, George Bernard Shaw (who openly admits his debt to Graham for "Captain Brassbound's Conversion" as well as a key line in Arms and the Man) and G. K. Chesterton, who proclaimed him "The Prince of Preface Writers" and famously declared in his autobiography that while Cunninghame Graham would never be allowed to be Prime Minister, he instead "achieved the adventure of being Cunninghame Graham", which Shaw described as "an achievement so fantastic that it would never be believed in a romance."

There is a seat dedicated to Cunninghame Graham in the Scottish Storytelling Centre in Edinburgh with the inscription:
"R B 'Don Roberto' Cunninghame Graham of Gartmore and Ardoch, 1852–1936, A great storyteller".

Cunninghame Graham in art
Cunninghame Graham was a staunch supporter of the artists of his day and a popular subject. He sat for artists such as Sir William Rothenstein, who painted Don Roberto as The Fencer; Sir John Lavery, whose famous Don Roberto: Commander for the King of Aragon in the Two Sicilies was on the cover of the Penguin Books edition of Conrad's Nostromo for many years and who painted the equestrian portrait of Don Roberto on his favourite horse, Pampa; and G. P. Jacomb-Hood, who painted his official portrait on entering parliament, with whom, along with Whistler, he was personal friends. George Washington Lambert painted him in oil with his horse Pinto and James McBey portrayed him in old age. There are also busts by Weiss and Jacob Epstein. The Dumbarton born artist, William Strang, used Cunninghame Graham as the model for his series of etchings of Don Quixote. It is unsurprising that he was at the mercy of cartoonists such as Tom Merry, who portrayed him in prison garb, and caricaturists such as Max and Spy.

Final years 

Robert Cunninghame Graham remained sprightly and rode daily even in his eighties. He continued to write, and held the office of President of the Scottish Branch of the P.E.N. Club, and involve himself in politics. He died from pneumonia on 20 March 1936 at the Plaza Hotel in Buenos Aires, Argentina, following a visit to the birthplace of his friend William Hudson. He lay in state in the Casa del Teatro and received a countrywide tribute led by the President of the Republic before his body was shipped home to be buried beside his wife on 18 April 1936, in the ruined Augustinian Priory on the island of Inchmahome, Lake of Menteith, Stirling. The following year, June 1937, a monument, the Cunninghame Graham Memorial, was unveiled at Castlehill, Dumbarton, near the family home at Ardoch. Despite the monument being removed to Gartmore in 1981, closer to the principal Graham estate, which he had been forced to sell in 1901 to the shipping magnate and founder of the Clan Line, Sir Charles Cayzer, Bt, the Cunninghame Graham Memorial Park (which is managed by the National Trust for Scotland) is still affectionately locally known as "the Mony". His estates at Ardoch and feudal barony of Gartmore passed to his nephew, Captain (later Admiral Sir) Angus Cunninghame Graham, the only son of his brother Cdr. Charles Elphinstone-Fleeming Cunninghame Graham, MVO.

Bibliography

 Notes on the district of Menteith: for tourists and others (1895)
 Father Archangel of Scotland and other essays (1896)
 Mogreb-el-Acksa: A Journey in Morocco (1898)
 Aurora La Cujiñi: A Realistic Sketch in Seville (1898)
 The Ipané (1899)
 Thirteen Stories (1900)
 A Vanished Arcadia: Being Some Account of the Jesuits in Paraguay, 1607 to 1767 (1901)
 Success (1902)
 Hernando de Soto; together with an account of one of his captains, Gonçalo Silvestre (1903)
 Progress (1905)
 His People (1906)
 Santa Teresa: being some account of her life and times (1907)
 Rhymes from a world unknown (Preface) (1908)
 Faith (1909)
 Hope (1910)
 Charity (1912)
 A Hatchment (1913)
 Scottish Stories (1914)
 Bernal Diaz del Castillo: being some account of him (1915)
 Brought Forward (1917)
 A Brazilian mystic: being the life and miracles of Antonio Conselheiro (1920)
 Cartagena and the Banks of the Sinú (1920)
 The Conquest of New Granada: Being the Life of Gonzalo Jimenez de Quesada (1922)
 The Dream of the Magi (1923)
 Doughty Deeds: an account of the life of Robert Graham of Gartmore (1925)
 Pedro de Valdivia, conqueror of Chile (1926)
 Redeemed: And Other Sketches (1927)
 Jose Antonio Paez (1929)
 Thirty Tales & Sketches (1929)
 Writ in sand (1932)
 Portrait of a dictator: Francisco Solano Lopez (1933)
 Mirages (1936)
 Rodeo: A Collection of the Tales and Sketches (1936)
 Reincarnation: The Best Short Stories of R. B. Cunninghame Graham (1979) posthumous

Further reading
 Hubbard, Tom (1982), "Revaluation: R.B. Cunninghame Grahame", in Murray, Glen (ed.), Cencrastus No. 8, Spring 1982, pp. 27 - 30, 
 Munro, Lachlan (ed.) (2017), An Eagle in a Henhouse: Selected Political Speeches and Writings of R.B. Cunninghame Graham, Ayton Publishing Ltd., Turriff, 
 Munro, Lachlan (2022), R.B. Cunninhame Graham and Scotland: Party, Prose and Political Aesthetic, Edinburgh University Press, 
 Sassi, Carla & Stroh, Silke (2017), Empires and Revolutions: Cunninghame Graham and his Contemporaries, Scottish Literature International, Glasgow 
 Taylor, Anne (2005), The People's Laird, The Tobias Press 
 Watts, Cedric & Davies, Laurence (1979), Cunninghame Graham: A Critical Biography, Cambridge University Press, Cambridge

Footnotes

Bibliographies
A bibliography of the first editions of the works of Robert Bontine Cunninghame Graham, compiled with a foreword by Leslie Chaundy, London: Dulau, & Co. 1924
Cunninghame Graham and Scotland: an annotated bibliography, John Walker, Dollar: Douglas S. Mack, 1980

References

The Adventures of Don Roberto A Caledonia TV production for BBC Scotland, broadcast on BBC2 2008-12-15.
The People's Laird: A Life of Robert Bontine Cunninghame Graham by Anne Taylor, The Tobias Press, 2005
Gaucho Laird: The Life of R.B. Don Roberto Cunninghame Graham, by Jean Cunninghame Graham, Long Riders' Guild, 2004
R.B. Cunninghame Graham: Fighter for Justice, by Ian M. Fraser (privately published 2002)
Revaluation: R.B. Cunninghame Graham, by Tom Hubbard, in Cencrastus No. 8, Spring 1982, pp. 27 – 30, 
R.B. Cunninghame Graham, by Cedric Watts, Boston, Mass.: G. K. Hall, Twayne, 1983.
Cunninghame Graham: A Centenary Study, Hugh MacDiarmid, with a foreword by R.E. Muirhead, Glasgow: Caledonian Press, 1952
Cunninghame Graham: A Critical Biography, Cedric Watts and Laurence Davies, Cambridge [Eng.], New York: Cambridge University Press, 1979
Don Roberto: being the account of the life and works of R. B. Cunninghame Graham, 1852–1936, A. F. Tschiffely, London, Toronto: William Heinemann, 1937
A Modern Conquistador: Cunninghame Graham His Life and Works, by Herbert Faulkner West, Cranley Day, 1932
Don Roberto: vida y obra de R. B. Cunninghame Graham, 1852–1936, A. F. Tschiffely; versión castellana de Julio E. Payró, Buenos Aires: Guillermo Kraft, 1946
El Escocés Errante: R. B. Cunninghame Graham, Alicia Jurado, Buenos Aires: Emecé Editores, c1978
Robert and Gabriela Cunninghame Graham, Alexander Maitland, Edinburgh: William Blackwood and Sons Ltd, 1983
The Friendship between W.H. Hudson and Cunninghame Graham; translation of an article ... in the Buenos Aires illustrated weekly Acquí Está, José Luis Lanuza, Argentina: Florencio Varela, n.d.
Lecture on R.B. Cunninghame Graham for the Anglo-Argentine Society, 24 January 1979, Jean Polwarth, London: n.p., 1979
Jorge Luis Borges Lecture on R. B. Cunninghame Graham for the Anglo Argentinian Society, 30 September 1986, Alicia Jurado, Royal Society of Arts, London: n.p., 1986
Personalidad de Robert Bontine Cunninghame Graham: extracto de la tesis doctoral ... en la Facultad de Filosofía y Letras de la Universidad de Madrid sobre: Robert Bontine Cunninghame Graham : personalidad del autor y estudio crítico de sus ensayos, Julio Llorens Ebrat., Madrid: Florencio Varela, 1963
Testimonio a Roberto B. Cunninghame Graham, Buenos Aires: P.E.N. Club Argentino, 1941
The North American Sketches of R. B. Cunninghame Graham, John Walker (ed.), Tuscaloosa, University of Alabama Press, 1987
The Scottish Sketches of R.B. Cunninghame Graham, John Walker (ed.), Edinburgh, Scottish Academic Press, 1982
The South American Sketches of R. B. Cunninghame Graham, John Walker (ed.), Norman, University of Oklahoma Press, 1985
An Eagle In a Hen-House: Selected Political Speeches and Writings of R. B. Cunninghame Graham, Lachlan Munro, The Deveron Press, 2017.
Joseph Conrad's Letters to R. B. Cunninghame Graham, Cedric Watts (ed.), London, Cambridge University Press, 1969
South London Chronicle, 9 June 1888, page 7, SHRA Conference (Tuesday).Empires & Revolutions: Cunninghame Graham & His Contemporaries.' Carla Sassi and Silke Stroh (Eds.) 2017, ASLS.

External links

Archival collections
 Guide to the Anne Elizabeth Bontine Diaries and Other Materials. Special Collections and Archives, The UC Irvine Libraries, Irvine, California.

Other
Biographical Profile at ElectricScotland.com 
The Cunninghame Graham Collection Series
Rare Reprints – Cunninghame Graham
 
 
R. B. Cunninghame Graham, Rauner Special Collection, Dartmouth College Library, N.H.
Canning House Special Collection – R. B. Cunninghame Graham
Slainte: Information & Libraries Scotland – Robert Bontine Cunninghame Graham
The Cunninghame Graham Collection

First Foot – Cunninghame-Graham
Los Caballos de la Conquista – Robert Cunninghame Graham
Robert Cunninghame-Graham by Raymond Vettese
Robert_Bontine_Cunninghame_Graham_1852-1936
National Portrait Gallery
Gartmore House – history
Finlaystone House – history
Cross party support to honour Scottish Hero Robert Cunninghame Graham

1852 births
1936 deaths
Anglo-Scots
Writers from London
People educated at Harrow School
Presidents of the Scottish National Party
Scottish journalists
Scottish explorers
Scottish nationalists
Scottish travel writers
20th-century Scottish historians
Scottish biographers
Scottish essayists
Scottish socialists
Scottish Liberal Party MPs
Scottish translators
Members of the Parliament of the United Kingdom for Scottish constituencies
UK MPs 1886–1892
Deaths from pneumonia in Argentina
Scottish Labour Party (1888) politicians
British political party founders
19th-century Scottish historians